Ostrožská Nová Ves (until 1924 Nová Ves u Ostrohu) is a municipality and village in Uherské Hradiště District in the Zlín Region of the Czech Republic. It has about 3,400 inhabitants.

Administrative parts
The village of Chylice is administrative part of Ostrožská Nová Ves.

References

Villages in Uherské Hradiště District
Moravian Slovakia